Enterography is medical imaging of the intestines. Thus it may refer to: 

 Upper gastrointestinal series
 Lower gastrointestinal series
CT Enterography
MR Enterography

It usually refers to an upper gastrointestinal series, in which sense it is distinguished from colonography, a lower gastrointestinal series (whereas the broader sense is hypernymous to colonography).